The Mid-Atlantic version of the NWA Brass Knuckles Championship was a short-lived championship that was defended sporadically and periodically in Jim Crockett, Jr.'s Mid-Atlantic Championship Wrestling. Created in 1978, the title was used in specialty matches in which the combatants would wear brass knuckles. The idea never really gained ground in the Mid-Atlantic territory and the title was permanently retired in 1986. There were other brass knuckles championships used in the NWA, such as in Texas and Florida, where the titles were more prominent and defended on a regular basis.

Title history

See also
List of National Wrestling Alliance championships

References

External links

Jim Crockett Promotions championships
National Wrestling Alliance championships
Regional professional wrestling championships
Hardcore wrestling championships